French Mills is an unincorporated community in western Madison County, in the U.S. state of Missouri. The community is on Marble Creek, just west of that stream's confluence with the St. Francis River.

History
A post office called French Mills was established in 1879, and remained in operation until 1886. The community was named for the French proprietor of a local watermill.

References

Unincorporated communities in Madison County, Missouri
Unincorporated communities in Missouri